Amie Cunat (born 1986 in McHenry, Illinois) is a Japanese-American artist who specializes in painting and installation. Cunat is best known for her colorful installation pieces described as "totally immersive"  and "ostensibly buoyant". Cunat's paintings and installations utilize biomorphic forms and vibrant hues to investigate parallels between abstraction and perception. She received her MFA from Cornell University, a Post-Baccalaureate in Painting and Drawing from The School of the Art Institute of Chicago, and her BA in Visual Arts and Art History from Fordham University. Cunat has had solo exhibitions in New York and abroad at the Victori+Mo, The Knockdown Center, Sunroom Project Space at Wave Hill, The Cooper Union, among others.

Career
Cunat's work has been shown internationally as well as in a variety of venues throughout New York state, where she works as Adjunct Faculty in Painting and Drawing at Fordham University.

Exhibitions

Solo exhibitions
 Victori + Mo, Brooklyn, NY, Meetinghouse, 2018
 Knockdown Center, Queens, NY, The Clock is Taking a Nap, 2017
 Sunroom Project Space, Wave Hill, Bronx, NY, Hideout, 2016
 Outside, North Adams, MA, Moon Nets, Alphabet Letters, 2016
 Foley Gallery - Window Installation, New York, NY, Clue, Cue, 2016
 The Cooper Union, New York, NY, Octopi Kōen, 2014

Select two person and group exhibitions
 SPRING/BREAK Art Show, New York, NY, C+C: Kat Chamberlin and Amie Cunat, Curated by Nicholas Cueva, 2017
 Sine Gallery at tête, Berlin, Germany, Sine Gallery: Berlin, 2017
 No Place Gallery, Columbus, OH, Western Decoy, 2017
 Ventana 244, Brooklyn, NY, Oysters With Lemon, 2015
 White Box Gallery, New York, NY, Suggestions Toward Future Conversations, 2012

References

External links
 Official website

Living people
1986 births
Cornell University alumni
People from McHenry, Illinois
American artists of Japanese descent
21st-century American women artists
21st-century American painters
American installation artists
American women installation artists
School of the Art Institute of Chicago alumni
Fordham University alumni
Fordham University faculty
American women academics
American contemporary painters